Totopo, in Mexican cuisine, is a flat, round, or triangular corn item similar to a tortilla, that has been toasted, fried or baked, but it may be prepared with nixtamalized corn masa. Totopos are best known as originating from Zapotec peoples of the isthmus of Tehuantepec region of the Mexican state of Oaxaca. Totopos resemble a round, baked tortilla chip or certain types of Scandinavian flat bread; however, unlike tortillas, salt is added to the masa and holes are made in the disk prior to baking.

Totopo may also refer to triangular fried tortillas, which are essentially tortilla chips. When the whole round tortilla is baked or fried it is generally known as a tostada.

An important feature of the baking and salting process is preservation. To prevent the decomposition of the corn and growth of mold, regular tortillas generally need to be eaten the same day as they are made (or stored cold) due to the moisture content, whereas totopos may be stored for future consumption, in the same manner as dry crackers.

In some cases, fried tortilla chips commercially made both in Mexico and the United States are labeled as or referred to as totopos, although they are not made in the manner of the Oaxacan totopo and are more akin to tortilla chips.

Etymology
The name totopo comes from the Aztec (or Nahuatl) , meaning 'toasted thing or thing that crunches when eaten', from the verb  'to crunch or to toast'. To differentiate the word from other toasted things, sometimes the compound  was used, meaning 'toasted tortilla'. The combined word means, approximately, 'tortillas that are noisy to chew'.

References

External links

 Photos of totopos and explanation in Spanish (link broken as of 2009-05-09, archive copy)
  Photos of
 Totopo Oven Comixcal

Oaxacan cuisine
Maize dishes
Mexican breads
Tortilla